Wonder Showzen is an American adult sketch comedy television series that aired between 2005 and 2006 on MTV2. It was created by Vernon Chatman and John Lee of PFFR.

Described as a children's television series for adults, the show's format is a parody of educational PBS Kids shows such as Sesame Street and The Electric Company (e.g. use of stock footage, puppetry, and clips of children being interviewed). In addition to general controversial comedy, it satirizes politics, religion, war, sex and culture with black comedy.

Development
Wonder Showzen was created by Vernon Chatman and John Lee, who originally made an early concept of it back in 1999, and pitched to the USA Network in 2000, but after a few minutes of viewing, executives there quickly concluded it did not fit the network's programming style. However, Viacom was re-branding MTV2 and made Wonder Showzen part of its new programming lineup. It aired as part of Sic 'Em Fridays, along with Dirty Sanchez and Wildboyz. The pilot and early concept were named simply "Kids Show". The Wonder Showzen theme song was also called 'Kids Show'. Reruns of the show also aired on MTV and Comedy Central. The first episode had animated segments provided by Raw Power, while the rest of the series had animated segments done by Augenblick Studios.

Ben Q. Jones, who was a member of the art collective Paper Rad, did some animations for the series, before continuing to work with PFFR again on his failed Adult Swim pilot Neon Knome, which was rejected, yet turned a show on Cartoon Network called The Problem Solverz, which Jones himself created. Another notable crew member who worked on Wonder Showzen was Mark Marek, who also worked on Cartoon Network's Mad and Nickelodeon's KaBlam!; he created Yuck, Yuck, Goose, and his sidekick, his Butt for Wonder Showzen.

MTV released the first season of Wonder Showzen on DVD March 28, 2006. The second season of Wonder Showzen premiered on March 31, 2006 and had its season-two finale starring Clarence on May 19, 2006 on MTV2. This season was released on DVD October 10, 2006, with an easter egg that featured an animation contest. The grand prize was announced as the winner's animation appearing on "the next DVD", but the creators later said a third season was unlikely, and MTV afterward canceled the show.

Cast and characters

Adults
 Vernon Chatman (Chauncey/Clarence/Various Voices)
 John Lee (Wordsworth/Him/Various Voices)
 Alyson Levy (Sthugar/Various Voices)
 Jim Tozzi (Various Voices)

Kids
 Benjamin Krueger
 Evan Seligman
 Taylor Bedlivy
 P.J. Connaire
 Jacob Kogan
 Michael Samms
 Trevor Heins
 Miles Kath
 Jasmina Lee
 Dominic Payer
 Mike Gibbons
 Alexandra Rose
 Frankie Scapoli
 Ryan Soos
 Brianna Simpkins
 Miles Williams
 Pierce Gidez
 Madison Rose
 Ameerah Moore
 Ryan Simpkins
 Juliet DePaula
Sam Kaufman

Cameos

Season one
Jon Glaser as Mr. Story in episode 101.
Flavor Flav as himself in episode 101, The full "Storytime with Flavor Flav" was cut from the broadcast version of the episode. It still appears however on the Season One DVD.
Dick Gregory as Mr. Sun in episode 103.
Amy Sedaris as Miss Amy in episode 106.
Christopher Meloni as the Chewties Spokesman in episode 107.
Chris Anderson as Koby Teeth in episode 104.
Madison Rose as herself in episodes 106 and 108.

Season two
David Cross as T-Totaled Timbo in episode 203, Hostage in episode 206, and Junkyard Jessip in episode 207.
Judah Friedlander as Crickey in episodes 203 and 207.
Jon Glaser as Dr. Rawstein in episodes 203 and 207.
Darlene Violette as Bettsy Beth Bethanie in episodes 203 and 207.
Amy Poehler as Miss Mary in episodes 203 and 206.
John Oates as himself, singing in the song, "War never solves anything" in episode 206.
Devendra Banhart as himself, singing in the song, "War never solves anything" in episode 206.
Rick Springfield as himself, singing in the song, "War never solves anything" in episode 206.
Corin Tucker as herself, singing in the song, "War never solves anything" in episode 206.
Todd Barry as Barold Q. Mosley in episode 207.
Zach Galifianakis as Uncle Daddy in episode 207.
Will Oldham as Pastor Pigmeat in episode 207.
Heather Lawless as Permanently Pregnant Peggy in episode 203 and 207.
Barbara Ann Davison as Cousin Grandma Pervis in episode 203 and 207.
Chris Anderson as Mr. Corn in episode 203

Recurring segments
 Beat Kids – One of the children, most often Trevor, leads a journalistic segment with mostly offensive, humorous questions, ridiculing interviewees at a given venue. The segment appears in almost every episode. 
 What's Jim Drawing? – Appeared in episode 202 and 206.
 Horse Apples – A segment in episode 203, which later expanded into an entire episode in 207, that parodies Hee Haw and redneck comedy. The latter episode featured several guest actors.
 Funny/Not Funny – A series of clips, often depicting violent or macabre images, airs with a chorus of children saying either "funny" or "not funny". 
 So Now You Know – A parody of "The More You Know", Where kids say questions and a computer shows their answers. It appeared twice on season one and once on season two in episode 205.
 Q&A – A series of children each answer a single question.
 Breaking News – Features the news reporter.
 We Went To... – Children narrate an ostensibly educational trip while old stock film airs.
 Clarence's Movies – Clarence the puppet interviews people on the street on a common theme, usually antagonistically or obnoxiously, which is often reciprocated by violence or threats.
 Story Time – A special guest reads a story to the children. Guests have included Flavor Flav (as himself although it was unaired), Jon Glaser (as Mr. Story), David Cross (as a hostage), and Amy Sedaris (as Ms. Amy).
 Mr. Body – A cartoon segment that parodies the Slim Goodbody character from the Captain Kangaroo television series.
 D.O.G.O.B.G.Y.N – A cartoon chronicling a dog with the ability to aid in child birth; part of the title derives from a short form for "obstetrics and gynaecology", and part of it comes from the common domesticated dog.
 Tyler, America's Most Perfect Child – A young child with a disturbingly well-mannered demeanor, who often forms statements about how perfect, wonderful and special they are.

Episodes

Series overview

Early concept

Pilot

Season 1 (2005)

Season 2 (2006)

Broadcast
It aired in Canada on MTV2, the United Kingdom and Ireland on MTV Two, MTV and TMF, Australia on MTV, Germany and Italy on MTV Entertainment, Latin America on MTV Latin America and in the Baltics on MTV Networks Baltic. In Turkey, it aired on Euro D with graphic scenes cut.

Reception
Matt Groening, creator of The Simpsons and Futurama said "Wonder Showzen is so weirdly funny the top of your head will burst and your skull will fly out."

Cartoon Network's Adult Swim, who PFFR would later make shows for, said "It's a show about kids, for freaks, and we love it."

The first season holds a 100% on Rotten Tomatoes.

Home releases

A gift set containing both seasons was scheduled for release on December 12, 2006, but it was cancelled. It was announced again almost 15 years later on March 16, 2021 and actually was released, but was just a re-package of the original DVDs without their physical extras. It's also currently streaming on Paramount Plus.

See also
 Adult puppeteering
 Don't Hug Me I'm Scared
 Xavier: Renegade Angel

Notes

References

Other sources
Wonder Showzen's page on MTV2.com
Interview with The A.V. Club
Wonder Showzen's Animators
Rotten Library

External links

 
 
 
  Wonder Showzen animated shorts from Augenblick studios (requires flash).
 New York Times review

2000s American adult animated television series
2000s American sketch comedy television series
2005 American television series debuts
2006 American television series endings
American adult animated comedy television series
American television shows featuring puppetry
English-language television shows
MTV cartoons
MTV2 original programming
American television series with live action and animation
Television series by PFFR
Television controversies in the United States
American surreal comedy television series